Hayriye can refer to:

 Hayriye, Çardak
 Hayriye, İnegöl
 Hayriye, Söğüt

Hayriye Melek Hunç (1896-1963) Turkish woman author of the Circassians descent
 Hayriye Ayşe Nermin Neftçi (1924-2003), Turkish politician